Kallarat is a village in the Kurvelesh region in Vlorë County, Albania. It lies in south-west Albania, on the river Shushicë, 24 km from the Ionian Sea. It was part of the former municipality Horë-Vranisht. At the 2015 local government reform it became part of the municipality Himarë. Its name contains the Albanian suffix -at, widely used to form toponyms from personal names and surnames.

References

Villages in Vlorë County